Helga Sigurðardóttir (born 23 April 1969) is an Icelandic freestyle swimmer. She competed in two events at the 1992 Summer Olympics.

References

External links
 

1969 births
Living people
Icelandic female freestyle swimmers
Olympic swimmers of Iceland
Swimmers at the 1992 Summer Olympics
Place of birth missing (living people)